Birds described in 1896 include  black-fronted bushshrike, buff-faced scrubwren, coppery-tailed coucal, crested white-eye, Madagascar plover, orange-billed lorikeet, Ruspoli's turaco, Visayan pygmy babbler, Storm's stork, green-headed oriole

Events 
Death of Juan Gundlach, Henry Barnes-Lawrence, John Stanislaw Kubary, 
Henry Seebohm bequeaths his collection of bird-skins to the British Museum

Publications
Richard Bowdler Sharpe A Hand-Book to the Birds of Great Britain. (4 volumes). London: Edward Lloyd. 1896–1897.
George Ernest Shelley The birds of Africa, comprising all the species which occur in the Ethiopian region (1896-1912, 5 vols). London,Published for the author by R.H. Porter (18 Princes Street, Cavendish Square, W.),1896-1912.online BHL
John Cordeaux Order Anseres in Arthur Gardiner Butler British Birds with their Nests and Eggs in six volumes Brumby & Clarke Ltd. 1896 Hull / London online BHL
Ernst Hartert An Account of the Collections of Birds made by Mr. William Doherty in the Eastern Archipelago. Novitates Zoologicae iii. p. 537, 1896 online BHL
Ongoing events
Osbert Salvin and Frederick DuCane Godman 1879–1904. Biologia Centrali-Americana . Aves
Richard Bowdler Sharpe Catalogue of the Birds in the British Museum London,1874-98.
Eugene W. Oates and William Thomas Blanford 1889–1898. The Fauna of British India, Including Ceylon and Burma. Vols. I-IV. Birds.
Anton Reichenow, Jean Cabanis,  and other members of the German Ornithologists' Society in Journal für Ornithologie online BHL
The Ibis
Novitates Zoologicae
Ornithologische Monatsberichte Verlag von R. Friedländer & Sohn, Berlin.1893–1938 online Zobodat
Ornis; internationale Zeitschrift für die gesammte Ornithologie.Vienna 1885-1905online BHL
The Auk online BHL

References

Bird
Birding and ornithology by year